Slaphappy Sleuths is a 1950 short subject directed by Jules White starring American slapstick comedy team The Three Stooges (Moe Howard, Larry Fine and Shemp Howard). It is the 127th entry in the series released by Columbia Pictures starring the comedians, who appeared in 190 shorts for the studio between 1934 and 1959.

Plot
The Stooges are investigators for the Onion Oil company, whose service stations are being robbed by a gang of crooks. On the job, the Stooges provide nothing less than first-class service. However, most of the services are not typical of your standard gas station (shaves, manicures and cologne and popcorn), and they still manage to be robbed when their backs are turned.

Tracing a trail of motor oil to the crooks' hideout, the Stooges demonstrate boxing skills far more effective than their earlier detective skills.

Cast

Credited
 Moe Howard as Moe
 Larry Fine as Larry
 Shemp Howard as Shemp
 Stanley Blystone as Ed, the gang leader
 Gene Roth as Fuller Grime
 Emil Sitka as Customer

Uncredited
 Nanette Bordeaux as Louise
 Vernon Dent as unknown (cut role)
 Joe Palma as Spike, a gang member
 Blackie Whiteford as Butch, a gang member

Production notes
Slaphappy Sleuths was filmed on April 11–14, 1949 and released 19 months later in November 1950.

The gag of a third Stooge acting like a bloodhound and tries to sniff out the tracks of enemies was also used in Goofs and Saddles (1937) and Phony Express (1943). The gas pumps have female gas names: Ethel; Hazel and Becky.

External links

References

1950 films
1950 comedy films
The Three Stooges films
American black-and-white films
Films directed by Jules White
Columbia Pictures short films
American comedy short films
1950s English-language films
1950s American films